Agagus stellamaris is a species of sea snail, a marine gastropod mollusk in the family Trochidae, the top snails.

Description
The shell grows to a length of 10 mm.

Distribution
This marine species occurs off KwaZulu-Natal, South Africa and off East Africa.

References

External links
 To USNM Invertebrate Zoology Mollusca Collection
 To World Register of Marine Species

Trochidae
Gastropods described in 1991